DASAN Networks (다산네트웍스) develops and manufactures network equipment for fixed and mobile broadband services.
DASAN Networks was established as DASAN Engineering Co., Ltd in 1993, listed in KOSDAQ in 2000, and changed its company name to DASAN Networks Inc. in 2002. In April 2015, DASAN Networks has established

DASAN Network Solutions as a subsidiary company to specialize in network products development, production and sales. They include FTTx (Fiber-to-the-x), Ethernet Switch, xDSL, Mobile Backhaul, Wireless LAN.

Subsidiaries
DASAN Networks is a network equipment development company for fixed and mobile broadband services.
DASAN Networks became a holding company in April 2015 in order to consolidate network solution business. DASAN Networks is a parent company that focuses on investment/management of its subsidiaries, as well as operation of network solution business for enterprise and government. DASAN Network Solutions, a subsidiary of DASAN Networks, focuses on network solutions for telecom operators around the world.

DASAN Networks is affiliated with HandySoft (software development company), DMC (automobile parts development company), Solueta (EMC solution development company), and DTS (Industrial heat exchanger development company).

Business
DASAN Networks’ major customers are SoftBank in Japan, Chunghwa Telecom in Taiwan, Viettel in Vietnam, KT Corporation, SK broadband, LG U+ in Korea and other global telecom operators.
To accommodate the increasing network traffic, DASAN Networks has developed Tera-speed high-performing switch and G.fast solution which enables telecom operators utilize existing network infrastructure. DASAN Networks also provides network solutions for IoT services for diverse industry including enterprise, government, school, military, tourism and transportation.

Products
FTTH, Ethernet switch, xDSL, Wireless Access, IP-PTT, Security Switch

References

South Korean brands
Telecommunications companies of South Korea
Telecommunications equipment vendors
Networking hardware companies